Eli Mahpud (born 25 March 1961) is an Israeli former association football player and manager.

Career
Mahpud spent two spells as manager of Hapoel Petah Tikva, first leading them to promotion from the Liga Leumit in 2008 before being dismissed in 2009, then reappointed in December 2009 only to quit his post ten months later. Between these appointments he led Maccabi Ahi Nazareth to promotion to the Israeli Premier League before leaving the club bottom of that league.

Honours
Israel State Cup (1):
1992
Toto Cup (3):
1985–86, 1989–90, 1990–91

References

1961 births
Israeli Jews
Living people
Israeli footballers
Hapoel Petah Tikva F.C. players
Israeli Premier League players
Israeli football managers
Hapoel Petah Tikva F.C. managers
Maccabi Ahi Nazareth F.C. managers
Hapoel Ashkelon F.C. managers
Hapoel Jerusalem F.C. managers
Maccabi Sha'arayim F.C. managers
Israeli Premier League managers
Israeli people of Yemeni-Jewish descent
Footballers from Petah Tikva
Association football midfielders